James Rosebrugh Leaming, M.D. (February 25, 1820 – December 5, 1892), was a preeminent physician specializing in heart and lung diseases, author and teacher.

Life

James Rosebrugh Leaming was born in Groveland, New York on February 25, 1820, eldest child of William Leaming and Jane Rosebrugh, granddaughter of Revolutionary war Chaplain Rev. John Rosbrugh. He attended Temple Hill Academy in Geneseo, New York, after which he apprenticed with Drs. Edward and Walter Lauderdale. In 1847 he attended the University of the City of New York, now New York University and received the degree of M.D. in 1849.

Leaming took up residency in New York City where he became well known as a teacher, author, and physician. He specialized in diseases of the heart and lungs and became a renowned authority on the subject. Early in his career his lectures on plural pathology and the interpleural origin of rales initially met with a storm of opposition; but within his lifetime he saw these enjoy widespread acceptance in the medical community.

Leaming was Professor Emeritus both of the Woman's Medical College (University of the City of New York) and the Polytechnic Institute of New York University where he also had served as the first President. He was a member of the New York Academy of Medicine, The New York County Medical Society, The New York State Medical Society, The Pathological Society, and the American Medical Association.

Shortly before his death he was honored by an assembly of distinguished guests in the drawing-room of his home, among whom was then President-elect Grover Cleveland. He died of tuberculosis at home in New York City on December 5, 1892.

Family

Leaming married first, in January 1853, to Jane Helen Cheesman, daughter of Rev. Lewis Cheesman, D.D., of Philadelphia. they had one son, Edward Leaming, who went on to become a physician in New York city like his father. She died June 27, 1865  In November 1868 he married Kathryn Lawton Strobel, daughter of Rev. W.D. Strobel, D.D., of Rhinebeck, NY; they had one daughter, Abby Anna Leaming. His third marriage was to Susan Emilia Nelson, daughter of John G. Nelson, who survived him.

Works

 Cardiac Murmurs, New York Journal of Medicine, 1848
 Respiratory Murmurs, New York Journal of Medicine, 1872
 Transactions of the New York Academy of Medicine, 2nd Series, 1874
 Plastic Exudation within the Pluria, Dry Pleurisy, Brown-Sequard's Archives, 1873
 Haemoptysis, Medical Record, 1874
 Disturbed Action and Functional Murmurs of the heart, Transactions of the New York Academy of Medicine, 2nd Series, 1876
 Fibroid Phthisis, read before the New York Academy of Medicine, 1876
 Physical Signs of Interpleural Pathological Processes (Reprinted from the Medical Record, May 25, 1878)
 Memoir of George P. Cammann, M.D.; Read before the New York Academy of Medicine, October 21st, 1863 (E.P. Dutton & Co., Boston, 1864)
 Contributions to the study of the heart and lungs (E.B. Treat, New York, 1887)

References

External links
 

1820 births
1892 deaths
19th-century American physicians
19th-century scholars
American art collectors
New York University Grossman School of Medicine alumni
People from Groveland, New York